Sand Hill Wildlife Management Area is located near Parkersburg, West Virginia in Wood and Ritchie counties.

Access to the northern section is from old US 50 at the county line. Access to the southern end of the WMA is from Volcano Road off the Mountwood Park exit of US 50.

Hunting and Fishing

Hunting opportunities in Sand Hill WMA include deer,  grouse, rabbit, squirrel, and turkey.

Although camping is not allowed at the WMA, camping is available at nearby North Bend State Park. A large firearm safety area is maintained around a mine on the northern section.  Fishing is also available at North Bend.

See also

Animal conservation
Hunting
Fishing
List of West Virginia wildlife management areas

References

External links
West Virginia DNR District 6 Wildlife Management Areas
West Virginia Hunting Regulations
West Virginia Fishing Regulations

Wildlife management areas of West Virginia
Protected areas of Ritchie County, West Virginia
Protected areas of Wood County, West Virginia
IUCN Category V